

This is a list of the National Register of Historic Places listings in Walsh County, North Dakota.

This is intended to be a complete list of the properties and districts on the National Register of Historic Places in Walsh County, North Dakota, United States. The locations of National Register properties and districts for which the latitude and longitude coordinates are included below, may be seen in a map.

There are 16 properties and districts listed on the National Register in the county.  Another property was once listed but has been removed.

Current listings

|}

Former listing

|}

See also 

 List of National Historic Landmarks in North Dakota
 National Register of Historic Places listings in North Dakota

References 

Walsh